Du bist Deutschland (in English: "You are Germany") was a social marketing campaign in Germany. Its aim was to achieve positive thinking and a new national feeling. It was created by the initiative "Partner für Innovation" consisting of 25 media corporations and was co-ordinated by Bertelsmann. The large-scale campaign caused a lot of controversy and discussion.

Overview
The initiator of the campaign was Gunther Thielen, CEO of Bertelsmann AG. It ran from September 26, 2005 to January 31, 2006. The core of the campaign was a 2-minute TV spot, which was broadcast simultaneously at the start of the campaign on almost all TV channels in the country. Additional advertisements in the print media, flyers, and outdoor and online media were used. The media cost was around 30 million Euros. All of the supporting corporations received no income for their contributions. The campaign was relaunched on December 15, 2007.

The background music used is from the U.S. composer Alan Silvestri and was the theme from the film Forrest Gump (1994).

Logo
The pictogram which was designed for the campaign consisted of three faces in the colours of the German national flag. It is similar to the logo of the 1992 Olympic Games in Barcelona, as it resembles a walking person.

Content

First campaign 

A similar slogan was first used in 1933 in Nazi Germany.
The goal of the campaign was to spur an increase of more confidence and people’s own initiative, and therefore result in more self-confidence and motivation for every German citizen.

A slogan was core of the campaign, which was the focus of the TV-spots. This showed the slogan “You are Germany” (Du bist Deutschland) in several variations. It was meant to invoke positive feelings and inspire the viewer.

Second campaign 
In 2007 the campaign appeals for more child friendliness in the German society because of the steadily falling birth rate in Germany. In the manifesto this becomes clear especially by the last verses: “Wir brauchen mehr von deiner Sorte, weil ohne dich die Gegenwart keinen Spaß bringt und die Zukunft bereits vergangen ist. Du bist Deutschland.” (We need more of your kind because without you the present is no fun and the future has already passed. You are Germany.)

Evaluation
Surveys conducted by the Gesellschaft für Konsumforschung (GfK) showed that two weeks after the start of the campaign, 54% of those who noticed the campaign consciously (35%) evaluated it positively.

Right from the beginning of the campaign there was a lot of criticism. The major complaint was that the tone of the campaign resembled campaigns from National Socialist times. For many the campaign was too nationalistic.

Business Supporters of the campaign

Television
ARD • Premiere (Pay-TV) • ProSiebenSat.1 Media Group • RTL Gruppe Deutschland • ZDF

Print
Axel Springer • Heinrich Bauer Verlag • Hubert Burda Media • Frankfurter Allgemeine Zeitung • Jahreszeitenverlag • Gruner + Jahr • Heise Medien Gruppe • Verlagsgruppe Georg von Holtzbrinck • Zeitungsgruppe Ippen • Verlagsgesellschaft Madsack • Motor Presse Stuttgart • Der Spiegel • Süddeutscher Verlag • WAZ-Mediengruppe • Zeitungsgruppe Stuttgart

Online
RTL Interactive • Tomorrow Focus • T-Online

Outdoor media
Ströer Out-of-Home Media

Cinema
WerbeWeischer

Celebrity Supporters of the Campaign (selection)
Gerald Asamoah • Reinhold Beckmann • Bobby Brederlow • Yvonne Catterfeld • Sarah Connor • Wojtek Czyz • Justus Frantz und Orchester • Maria Furtwängler • Günther Jauch • Oliver Kahn • Walter Kempowski • Johannes B. Kerner • Oliver Korittke • Walter Lange • Florian Langenscheidt • Patrick Lindner • Sandra Maischberger • Xavier Naidoo • Minh-Khai Phan-Thi • Oliver Pocher • Dominic Raacke • Marcel Reich-Ranicki • Hans Martin Rüter • Kool Savas • Achim Kreisel • Harald Schmidt • Gabriele Strehle • Gerd Strehle • Ulrich Wickert • Anne Will • Martin Winterkorn • Katarina Witt

References

External links
 Official website of the campaign (Cached copy)

Mass media in Germany
Advertising campaigns
German advertising slogans
Advertising and marketing controversies
2005 neologisms